HD 21447 is a probable binary star system located in the constellation Camelopardalis. The star is also known as HR 1046. It can be viewed with the naked eye, having an apparent visual magnitude of 5.09. It is a candidate for membership in the Ursa Major Moving Group.

The primary component is A-type main-sequence star with a stellar classification of A1 Va. It is around 146 million years old and is spinning with a projected rotational velocity of 182 km/s. The star has an estimated 2.32 times the mass of the Sun and about 1.9 times the Sun's radius.

References

External links 
http://www.alcyone.de/cgi-bin/search.pl?object=HR1046 
http://server3.wikisky.org/starview?object_type=1&object_id=1996

A-type main-sequence stars
Camelopardalis (constellation)
Durchmusterung objects
021447
016292
1046